John Burnet may refer to:

 John Burnet (MP) (by 1527–57/59), MP for Arundel
 John Burnet (painter) (1781–1868), Scottish engraver and painter
 John Burnet (abolitionist) (1789–1862), pastor in Camberwell
 John Burnet (architect) (1814–1901), Scottish architect
 John James Burnet (1857–1938), architect
 John Burnet (classicist) (1863–1928), Scottish classicist who wrote Early Greek Philosophy

See also 
John Burnett (disambiguation)
Johnny Burnette (1934–1964), musician